Lydia Victoria Night (born October 13, 2000) is an American musician primarily known for her work as the lead vocalist and rhythm guitarist of California rock band The Regrettes. She was also the lead vocalist and guitarist of pop rock bands Pretty Little Demons and LILA as well as a frequent collaborator with rock duo Dead Man's Bones. Robben Barquist of Collide Culture referred to Night as the new face of feminist punk. She is the daughter of Morgan Higby Night.

Biography

2000–2011: Early life
Night began performing live as young as two years old, singing the Ramones song "Beat on the Brat" for the soundcheck at her father's nightclub in New Orleans, where she was born. A few years later, she and her family relocated to Santa Monica, California, and soon after Los Angeles. When she was seven years old, she formed her first band LILA (which stood for Little Independent Loving Artists), who performed at school events and McCabe's guitar shop in Santa Monica.

2012–2014: Pretty Little Demons and Dead Man's Bones

In 2012, she formed the pop rock group Pretty Little Demons with drummer Marlhy Murphy. In 2013, the duo played South by Southwest, becoming the youngest performers to play at the festival. This caught the attention of Ryan Gosling, who asked her to join his band Dead Man's Bones.

In 2013, Pretty Little Demons released their debut EP "Flowers", followed by their album "Unknown Species" in 2014.

In 2014, Night began attending Grand Arts High School, a performing arts high school in Downtown Los Angeles.

2015–present: The Regrettes

In 2015, the duo changed their name to the Regrettes, releasing their debut four-track EP in October, called "Hey!", accompanied by a music video for its track "Hey Now!". Murphy subsequently departed from the band, leading to the hiring of, then-Genessa members, Genessa Gariano, Sage Chavis and Maxx Morando.

Under this line-up, the band released their debut album Feel Your Feelings Fool! on January 13, 2017, and its follow up, the 2018 EP Attention Seeker.

In 2018, she entered a romantic relationship with Dylan Minnette, which ended in 2022. 

On December 13, 2018 she featured on Gerard Way's Christmas song "Dasher".

On April 8, 2019 she was featured on Morrissey's cover of "Wedding Bell Blues", also with Billie Joe Armstrong.

On June 18, 2019, the band announced their second studio album, How Do You Love?, would be released on August 9.

On July 20, 2020, she revealed on her Instagram that Joey Armstrong of the band SWMRS sexually abused her during their relationship in 2017 when she was 16 and he was 22.

Influences
Night has cited influences from artists including The Crystals, Lesley Gore, Patsy Cline, Bikini Kill, L7, 7 Year Bitch, The Marvelettes, Diana Ross and Four Tops.

Discography

With Pretty Little Demons
Studio albums
Unknown Species (2014)

EPs
Flowers (2013)

With the Regrettes
Studio albums
Feel Your Feelings Fool! (2017)
How Do You Love? (2019)
Further Joy (2022)

EPs
Hey! EP (2015)
Attention Seeker (2018)

As a featured artist
Gerard Way – "Dasher" (2018)
Morrissey – "Wedding Bell Blues" (2019)

References

External links

2000 births
Living people
Musicians from New Orleans
21st-century American women singers
21st-century American women guitarists
21st-century American guitarists
21st-century American singers
The Regrettes members
Pretty Little Demons members
Women punk rock singers